Aare Mäemets (until 1936 Harry Michelson; 18 January 1929 Tallinn – 24 November 2002 Elva) was an Estonian hydrobiologist, zoologist, limnologist and nature photographer.

In 1954 he graduated from Tartu State University in biology. From 1955 until 1999, he worked at Estonian Institute of Zoology and Botany.

His main fields of research were Estonian lakes (including their limnological classification), estimation of lakes ecological conditions; he researched also water fleas.

Mäemets was married to hydrobotanist Aime Mäemets. Their daughter was biologist Helle Mäemets.

Awards
 1971: Soviet Estonia Prize
 1990: Eerik Kumar Nature Conservation Award
 2001: Order of the White Star, III class.

Works

 1960: "Eesti NSV vesikirbuliste fauna"
 1968: "Eesti järved" (one of the authors)
 1971: "Estonian Limnology"
 "Matk Eesti järvedele" (four editions)
  1977: "Eesti NSV järved ja nende kaitse"

References

1929 births
2002 deaths
Estonian zoologists
Estonian biologists
Limnologists
Estonian photographers
Recipients of the Order of the White Star, 3rd Class
University of Tartu alumni
Scientists from Tallinn